Wentworth Centre is a community located in Cumberland County, in the Canadian province of Nova Scotia.

References
Wentworth Centre on Destination Nova Scotia

Communities in Cumberland County, Nova Scotia
General Service Areas in Nova Scotia